Cheval Blanc is a luxury colonial-style hotel in Saint Barthélemy in the Caribbean, situated on Flamands Beach on the northwestern coast. It was awarded AAA/CAA Four Diamond Lodgings status for 2015. CNN notes that the interior white-washed furnishings are inspired by those of French chateaus, and that salmon pink is a common rendering. The hotel is served by two restaurants, La Case de l'Isle headed by Yann Vinsot by the pool, and La Cabane de l'Isle, and is frequented by wealthy celebrities, including Jay Z and Beyoncé, Ryan Seacrest, P. Diddy, Anthony Kiedis, Russell Simmons and Marc Jacobs.

References

External links
Official site
Cheval Blanc St-Barth with Casol

Hotels in Saint Barthélemy
Hotels established in 1991